The Old Public Library is a historic library building in Lawrence, Massachusetts.  The Richardsonian Romanesque structure was built in 1892 to a design by George G. Adams, a leading architect of public buildings in New England.  The building is predominantly brownstone, with terracotta trim bands, an irregular and asymmetric massing with a tower, and its entrance recessed in an archway.  It served as Lawrence's public library until 1973 when a new library building was built.

The building was listed on the National Register of Historic Places in 1978.

See also
National Register of Historic Places listings in Lawrence, Massachusetts
National Register of Historic Places listings in Essex County, Massachusetts

References

Library buildings completed in 1890
Buildings and structures in Lawrence, Massachusetts
Libraries on the National Register of Historic Places in Massachusetts
Libraries in Essex County, Massachusetts
National Register of Historic Places in Lawrence, Massachusetts